Mongkol Borey is a town and seat of Mongkol Borey District in Banteay Meanchey Province in north-western Cambodia. It is located 9 kilometres south of Serei Saophoan, the province's capital.

Towns in Cambodia
Mongkol Borey District
Populated places in Banteay Meanchey province